A list of films produced by the Bollywood film industry based in Mumbai in 1932:

A-B

C-I

J-M

N-R

S-Z

References

External links
Bollywood films of 1932 at IMDb

1932
Bollywood
Films, Bollywood